Hugh Ford may refer to:

Hugh Ford (director) (1868–1952), American film director and screenwriter
Hugh Ford (engineer) (1913–2010), British engineer
Hugh Alastair Ford (born 1946), Australian ornithologist

See also
Hugh Forde (disambiguation)